Relaxin/insulin-like family peptide receptor 3, also known as RXFP3, is a human G-protein coupled receptor.

See also
 Relaxin receptor

References

Further reading

External links

G protein-coupled receptors